

Eaton is a suburb in the Northern Territory of Australia located in the city of Darwin.

It consists of the land occupied by the Darwin International Airport and RAAF Base Darwin.

Eaton is named in commemoration of Charles Eaton (1895 - 1979), a senior officer in the Royal Australian Air Force whose service included appointment as the "Station Commander of RAAF Darwin" in 1940.  The suburb’s boundary and name were gazetted on 4 April 2007.

The 2016 Australian census which was conducted in August 2016 reports that Eaton had 213 people living within its boundaries.

Eaton is located within the federal division of Solomon, the territory electoral division of Spillett and the municipality of the City of Darwin.

References

Suburbs of Darwin, Northern Territory